The Oregon Trail: Sketches of Prairie and Rocky Mountain Life (also published as  The California & Oregon Trail) is a book written by Francis Parkman. It was initially serialized in twenty-one installments in Knickerbocker's Magazine (1847–49) and subsequently published as a book in 1849. The book is a first-person account of a 2-month summer tour in 1846 of the U.S. states of Nebraska, Wyoming, Colorado, and Kansas. Parkman was 23 at the time. The heart of the book covers the three weeks Parkman spent hunting buffalo with a band of Oglala Sioux. Some later printings such as the 18th edition (Holt, Rinehart, and Winston, 1969) included illustrations by James Daugherty.

Reception
The book was reviewed favorably by Herman Melville. However, he complains that it demeaned American Indians and its title was misleading (the book covers only the first third of the trail).

References

External links

The Oregon Trail, HTML, including artwork from 3 different editions/artists.
 The Oregon Trail, scanned books original editions color illustrated. 
 Notable editions from Internet Archive:
 The Oregon Trail of Francis Parkman, Ginn and Company, 1910. A lengthy introduction, bibliography, and footnotes by William Ellery Leonard with assistance by Frederick Jackson Turner.
 The Oregon Trail; Sketches of Prairie and Rocky Mountain Life, Chicago: Scott, Foresman, 1911. Includes introduction by American historian William Macdonald

1849 books
Oregon Trail
History books about the American Old West
Works originally published in The Knickerbocker